Nationality words link to articles with information on the nation's poetry or literature (for instance, Irish or France).

Events

Works published
 Robert Copland,  self-published in London; Great Britain

Births
Death years link to the corresponding "[year] in poetry" article:
 May 28 – Selim II (died 1574), Ottoman Turkish sultan and poet
 September 11 – Pierre de Ronsard (died 1585), French prince des poètes
 Date unknown – Thomas Tusser (died 1580), English chorister, agriculturalist and poet
 Approximate year
 Luís de Camões, also known as "Luiz Camoes" (died 1580), Portuguese national poet
 Louise Labé (died 1566), French poet
 Girolamo Parabosco (died 1577), Italian poet and musician

Deaths
Birth years link to the corresponding "[year] in poetry" article:
 January 5 – Marko Marulić (born 1450), Croatian poet and Christian humanist, known as "the Crown of the Croatian Medieval Age" and the "father of the Croatian Renaissance"; He signed his works as "Marko Marulić Splićanin" ("Marko Marulić of Split"), "Marko Pečenić", "Marcus Marulus Spalatensis", or "Dalmata"
 January 7 – Tang Yin died this year, according to some sources, or 1523 according to others (born 1470), Chinese poet, painter and calligrapher
 Giovanni Aurelio Augurelli (born 1456), Italian, Latin-language poet
 Francesco Negri (humanist) died this year or sometime later (born 1452), Italian, Latin-language poet

See also

 Poetry
 16th century in poetry
 16th century in literature
 French Renaissance literature
 Renaissance literature
 Spanish Renaissance literature

Notes

16th-century poetry
Poetry